Paul Beachem (born October 14, 1934) is an American sprint canoer who competed in the 1960s. At the 1960 Summer Olympics in Rome, he was eliminated in the semifinals of the K-1 1000 m event. Eight years later in Mexico City, Beachem was eliminated in the repechage round of the K-2 1000 m event.

References
Sports-reference.com profile

1934 births
American male canoeists
Canoeists at the 1960 Summer Olympics
Canoeists at the 1968 Summer Olympics
Living people
Olympic canoeists of the United States